Sodor may refer to:

 Sodor (fictional island), the setting for the Thomas the Tank Engine and Friends series
 Diocese of Sodor and Man of the Church of England
 Bishop of Sodor and Man
 Diocese of the Isles, pre-Reformation; also known as Diocese of Sodor
 Bishop of the Isles
 Kingdom of the Isles, a medieval kingdom